Lumberton is a city in Lamar and Pearl River counties, Mississippi, United States. It is part of the Hattiesburg, Mississippi Metropolitan Statistical Area. The population was 2,086 at the 2010 census.

History
The city was named for the local lumber industry.

Geography
Lumberton is located at  (31.003888, -89.453544). Most of the city is in Lamar County, with a small portion extending east into adjacent Pearl River County. In the 2000 census, 2,200 of the city's 2,228 residents (98.7%) lived in Lamar County and 28 (1.3%) in Pearl River County.

According to the United States Census Bureau, the city has a total area of 7.3 square miles (18.9 km2), of which 7.3 square miles (18.8 km2) is land and 0.04 square mile (0.1 km2) (0.27%) is water.

Demographics

2020 census

As of the 2020 United States census, there were 1,617 people, 725 households, and 435 families residing in the city.

2000 census
As of the census of 2000, there were 2,228 people, 829 households, and 602 families residing in the city. The population density was 307.1 people per square mile (118.5/km2). There were 920 housing units at an average density of 126.8 per square mile (48.9/km2). The racial makeup of the city was 45.56% White, 53.64% African American, 0.27% Native American, 0.09% Asian, 0.04% from other races, and 0.40% from two or more races. Hispanic or Latino of any race were 0.45% of the population.

There were 829 households, out of which 36.9% had children under the age of 18 living with them, 42.2% were married couples living together, 25.8% had a female householder with no husband present, and 27.3% were non-families. 25.8% of all households were made up of individuals, and 10.4% had someone living alone who was 65 years of age or older. The average household size was 2.66 and the average family size was 3.17.

In the city, the population was spread out, with 31.7% under the age of 18, 9.4% from 18 to 24, 26.5% from 25 to 44, 20.2% from 45 to 64, and 12.2% who were 65 years of age or older. The median age was 31 years. For every 100 females, there were 85.4 males. For every 100 females age 18 and over, there were 82.8 males.

The median income for a household in the city was $23,178, and the median income for a family was $26,603. Males had a median income of $26,563 versus $16,821 for females. The per capita income for the city was $11,384. About 23.2% of families and 30.8% of the population were below the poverty line, including 42.7% of those under age 18 and 29.3% of those age 65 or over.

Education
The City of Lumberton was served by the Lamar County School District. The Lumberton Public School District consolidated into it as of 2019.

Lumberton includes Lumberton Elementary School, Lumberton Middle School and Lumberton High School.

Notable people
Percy Bailey, former Negro league baseball pitcher
Elizabeth Bass, physician, educator, and suffragist
Richie Grant, safety for the Atlanta Falcons
Terry Grant, former running back for the Hamilton Tiger-Cats
Heber Austin Ladner, former longest serving Secretary of State of Mississippi
John Henry Prince, former Negro league third baseman
James H. Street, journalist, minister, and writer of Southern historical novels. 
Richard Alvin Tonry, Louisiana politician.
Henry Clay Yawn, former member of the Mississippi Senate

References

External links

 Official City of Lumberton Business Website

Cities in Mississippi
Cities in Lamar County, Mississippi
Cities in Pearl River County, Mississippi
Cities in Hattiesburg metropolitan area
U.S. Route 11